The 1999 Corby Borough Council election took place on 6 May 1999 to elect members of Corby Borough Council in Northamptonshire, England. It was the first election be held under new ward boundaries. The Labour retained overall control of the council, which it had held continuously since 1979.

Ward-by-ward results

Central Ward (3 seats)

Danesholme Ward (3 seats)

East Ward (2 seats)

Hazlewood Ward (3 seats)

Hillside Ward (1 seat)

Kingswood Ward (3 seats)

Lloyds Ward (3 seats)

Lodge Park (3 seats)

Rural East Ward (2 seats)

Rural North Ward (1 seats)

Rural West Ward (1 seat)

Shire Lodge (2 seats)

West Ward (2 seats)

References

1999 English local elections
1999
1990s in Northamptonshire